Chimakurthy is a Town with civic status as Nagar Panchayath in Prakasam district of the Indian state of Andhra Pradesh. It is also a mandal headquarters for Chimakurthi mandal in Ongole revenue division.

References 

 Villages in Prakasam district
 Mandal headquarters in Prakasam district